Tamblyn is a surname that originates in Wales. 

Notable people with the surname include:

 Amber Tamblyn (born 1983), American actress and poet
 Christine Tamblyn, American artist
 Doni Tamblyn, American author and comedian
 Eddie Tamblyn (1908–1957), American actor
 Geoff Tamblyn (born 1949), Australian cricketer
 Gordon Tamblyn, founder of the Tamblyn Drugs chain in Canada
 Harold Tamblyn-Watts (1900–1999), British artist 
 Ian Tamblyn (born 1947), Canadian folk music singer-songwriter
 Russ Tamblyn (born 1934), American actor